Football (soccer) competitions at the 2023 Pan American Games in Santiago, Chile are schedule to take place between October 27 and November 4, 2023 at the Estadio Sausalito in Viña del Mar (men's tournament) and Estadio Elías Figueroa Brander in Valparaíso (women's).

The men's tournament was an under 22 competition, while the women's tournament had no age restrictions.

Qualification
A total of eight men's teams and eight women's team will qualify to compete at the games in each tournament. The host nation (Chile) qualified in each tournament, along with seven other teams in each tournament according to various qualifying criteria.

Summary

Men

Women

 Host nation Chile finished fifth, meaning sixth place Venezuela also qualified.

References

Football at the 2023
Events at the 2023 Pan American Games
Pan American Games
2023